Vivere Live in Tuscany is a live album and DVD of a pop concert by classical Italian tenor Andrea Bocelli. The concert was performed at Bocelli's Teatro del Silenzio in Lajatico, Tuscany, July 2007. In this DVD he performs duets with Sarah Brightman, Elisa, Laura Pausini and Heather Headley, and collaborates with Chris Botti, Lang Lang and Kenny G. It was certified Triple Diamond in Brazil, by the ABPD, with over 375,000 copies sold in the country.

Track listing

CD
 "Italia" featuring Chris Botti on trumpet
 "La Voce del Silenzio", duet with Elisa
 "Canto della Terra", duet with Sarah Brightman
 "Mille Lune Mille Onde"
 "Romanza" 
 "Se la Gente Usasse Il Cuore" (bonus studio recording)
 "Domani" (bonus studio recording)

DVD
"Melodramma"
"Romanza"
"A Te" featuring Kenny G on soprano sax
"Vivo per Lei", duet with Heather Headley 
"Io ci Sarò" featuring Lang Lang on piano 
"Hungarian Rhapsody No. 2 in C♯ minor" performed by Lang Lang 
"La Voce del Silenzio", duet with Elisa
"Dancing", performed by Elisa
"Canto della Terra", duet with Sarah Brightman
"Bellissime Stelle"
 Medley: "Besame Mucho", "Somos Novios" (It's Impossible), "Can't Help Falling in Love"
"Because We Believe"
"The Prayer", duet with Heather Headley 
"Italia" featuring Chris Botti on trumpet
"Dare to Live" (Vivere), duet with Laura Pausini
"Sogno"
"Il Mare Calmo della Sera"
"Time to Say Goodbye" (Con te Partirò), duet with Sarah Brightman

Sales and certification

References

External links
Details on Andrea Bocelli's official website

Andrea Bocelli video albums
Live video albums
2007 live albums
2007 video albums